Butyrsky (masculine), Butyrskaya (feminine), or Butyrskoye (neuter) may refer to:
Butyrsky District, a district in North-Eastern Administrative Okrug of the federal city of Moscow, Russia
Butyrskaya (Moscow Metro), a station of the Moscow Metro serving that district
Butyrskaya Prison, named for Butyrskaya Zastava, the gate exiting central Moscow towards the district
Butyrskaya Ulitsa, a street in central Moscow
Butyrsky Val, a street in central Moscow
Butyrsky (rural locality) (Butyrskaya, Butyrskoye), several rural localities in Russia
Maria Butyrskaya, a Russian figure skater

With the addition of a diminutive suffix, Butyrka (singular) or Butyrki (plural) may refer to:
Butyrki, Astrakhan Oblast
Butyrka, the prison
Butyrka (band), a Russian blatnaya pesnya band